Ancistrus yutajae is a species of catfish in the family Loricariidae. It is native to South America, where it occurs only in the Yutajé River in Venezuela. The species reaches at least 8.28 cm (3.3 inches) SL and was described in 2019 by Lesley S. de Souza of the Field Museum of Natural History, Donald C. Taphorn of the Royal Ontario Museum, and Jonathan Armbruster of Auburn University alongside five other species of Ancistrus. FishBase does not list this species.

References 

Fish described in 2019
yutajae
Fauna of Venezuela